Viviane de Muynck (born 1946) is a Belgian actress. She appeared in more than sixty films since 1982.

Selected filmography

References

External links 

1946 births
Living people
Belgian film actresses
People from Mortsel